Roberta Torre (born 21 September 1962) is an Italian film director and screenwriter. In 1997 she won the Nastro d'argento for best new director with her first film, Tano da morire ("To Die for Tano"). The film entered the 54th Venice International Film Festival, winning the FEDIC Award, the Kodak Award and the Luigi De Laurentiis Award for best directorial debut film. The film also won two David di Donatello (for best score and best new director) and two other Nastro d'Argento  for best score and best supporting role (an award given to the entire female cast).

Selected filmography
 To Die for Tano (1997)
 Sud Side Stori (2000)
 Il viaggio lungo di Arul, Rani e Vivetas (2002)
 Angela (2002)
 La malacanzone (2005)
 Mare nero (2006)
 Lost Kisses (2010)
 Bloody Richard (2017)

References

External links

1962 births
Living people
Italian film directors
Italian screenwriters
Film people from Milan
Nastro d'Argento winners
Ciak d'oro winners
Italian women film directors